"Vuelve" is a song recorded by Puerto Rican singer Ricky Martin for his fourth studio album, Vuelve (1998). The song was written by Franco De Vita, while the production was handled by K. C. Porter and Draco Rosa. It was released to radio stations by Sony Discos as the lead single from the album on January 26, 1998. A Spanish language power ballad and Latin pop song with elements of rock and gospel, it is about the singer's true love, who gives the meaning of his life. It received generally positive reviews from music critics, who complimented its romantic lyrics and Martin's vocal.

"Vuelve" was nominated for Pop Song of the Year at the 11th Annual Lo Nuestro Awards and won the award for Latin Pop Airplay Track of the Year at the 1999 Billboard Latin Music Awards. The song was commercially successful, reaching number one in eight countries, including Peru and Venezuela, as well as Billboards Hot Latin Songs, Latin Pop Airplay, and Tropical Airplay charts in the United States. The accompanying music video was filmed at the Ennis House in Los Angeles, California, and directed by Wayne Isham. It depicts Martin performing the track at various areas of the house. The track was included on the set lists for all of Martin's tours. De Vita recorded his own rendition of "Vuelve" on his studio album Segundas Partes Tambien Son Buenas (2002) and several contestants on various music talent shows have covered the song, including La Mole.

Background and release

In 1995, Ricky Martin released his third studio album, A Medio Vivir. On it, he shifted from his traditional ballad-style compositions to a riskier fusion of music focused on traditional Latin sounds, epitomized by the song "María". Taken aback by the starkly different musical style, his record label executives felt the song would ruin Martin's career. Despite this, "María" was chosen as the album's second single and became a breakthrough hit, reaching number one in France, Spain, Germany, Belgium, Holland, Switzerland, Finland, Italy, Turkey, and the whole of South America. As of 2014, A Medio Vivir had sold over three million copies worldwide. While on tour in 1997, Martin returned to the studio and began recording material for his fourth studio album. He said the experience of touring and recording at the same time was "brutal and incredibly intense". On December 7, 1997, Martin confirmed he was completing his next project and that the album would be released in February of the following year. He worked on the album with producers KC Porter and Rosa, and recorded it in studios across the United States, Puerto Rico, and Spain.

The album's title, Vuelve, was announced on January 25, 1998. In an interview with CNN en Español, he emphasized the album was going to "reaffirm the internationalization of my career and I know that it will help me a lot to destroy the stereotypes that may exist with my culture". The album consisting mainly of "red-hot" Latin dance numbers and "melodramatic" pop ballads. "Vuelve" was released as the album's lead single on January 26, 1998. While "La Copa de la Vida" was released as the lead single from the album in Asian and European markets, "Vuelve" was released as the third single in Austria and Germany on December 2, 1998. The track was included as the second track on Martin's fourth studio album, Vuelve, released February 12, 1998, The song was also later added to Martin's compilation albums La Historia (2001), 17 (2008), Personalidad (2015), and Esencial (2018). De Vita recorded his own version of the song on his studio album Segundas Partes Tambien Son Buenas (2002), with a "distinctly rock sound". When De Vita was asked why he made his own rendition of the song in an interview with El País, he clarified that he was not competing with Martin and simply wanted to give the track "another point of view".

Music and lyrics

"Vuelve" was penned by Venezuelan singer-songwriter Franco De Vita, while its production was handled by KC Porter and Rosa. A Spanish language power ballad and Latin pop song with "slow rock harmonies", it is a "sultry" romantic love song with a gospel chorus. The track runs for a total of five minutes and eight seconds. Lyrically, "Vuelve" which translates to "Come Back" in English, is for Martin's "true love, whom he says gives his life meaning". In a 2007 interview with Estudio Billboard, De Vita recalled he had been writing the song for 10 years when Martin asked him to compose a track for the album. He had previously collaborated with Martin by composing the previous album's title track. In the track, Martin chants: "Vuelve, que sin ti la vida se me va. Vuelve, que me falta el aire si tú no estás. Vuelve, nadie ocupará tu lugar" ("Come back, without you my life goes away. Come back, the air is missing if you're not here. Come back, nobody will take your place.")

Critical reception
"Vuelve" has been met with generally positive reviews from music critics. John Lannert of Billboard magazine described the track as "moving", while David Wild of Rolling Stone mentioned it as "lovely". An author of Radio Cooperativa named it "pure romanticism", and Vilma Maldonado of The Monitor called the song's hook "instant and unforgettable" and its lyrics "warmly romantic". Writing for Vista magazine, Carmen Teresa Roiz regarded "Vuelve" as a "brilliant, melodic work". For The Dallas Morning News, Mario Tarradell praised its "sexy" refrain and felt it "makes the best of his power-keg vocals". Although she acknowledged the song's success on the music charts, the Miami Herald editor Leila Cobo criticized "Vuelve" as one of the album's "weakest tracks". In a 2018 article for Billboard however, Cobo reflected on "Vuelve" and cited it as an example of Latin pop having previously been a "crooner’s game" and remarked: "[...] thank God for songs like 'Si No Te Hubieras Ido', 'Vuelve' or 'El Buen Perdedor' - how could we have survived heartache otherwise?" The Los Angeles Times Ernesto Lechner declared that the song's "delicate electric piano and anthemic chorus" would make its parent album "most likely survive the test of time".

Carlos Mario Castro from El Sabanero X named "Vuelve" Martin's best song, calling it "great without a doubt". He continued praising it for highlighting "the vocal capacity of Ricky Martin". An author of Cultura Colectiva named it Martin's "best heartbreak anthem" and stated: "Even if your heart is in a good place, this song is great to sing your lungs out." In a retrospective review of the Latin songs that reached number one in 1998, Billboard editor Jessica Roiz stated Martin "made everyone shed a tear" on "Vuelve". In 2015, Univision staff ranked the track as Martin's sixth-best ballad. Similarly, Claudia González Alvarado from Chilango ranked it as his sixth-best ballad in 2021. It was listed on MDZ Online's Ricky Martin's "Unmissable hits" which a writer described as "creative", and was mentioned as one of the 13 "Best Ricky Martin Songs to Add to Your Party Playlist" by Amanda Mitchell on Oprah Daily. MTV Argentina also ranked it as one of Martin's best songs in 2020. In his review for Vogue in 2021, Esteban Villaseñor ranked the song among Martin's most popular songs.

Accolades
Greta Alvarez from BuzzFeed placed "Vuelve" at number five on the list of "17 songs we all sang in the 90s and could never forget". In honor of National Hispanic Heritage Month in 2017, Grammy published a list of "11 Songs From Puerto Rican Artists", in which "Vuelve" was at the top of the list. At the 11th Annual Lo Nuestro Awards, the song was nominated in the category of Pop Song of the Year, which was awarded to Martin's "La Copa de la Vida". At the 6th Annual Billboard Latin Music Awards in the same year, "Vuelve" won Latin Pop Airplay Track of the Year and was nominated for Hot Latin Track of the Year, but lost to "Por Mujeres Como Tu" by Pepe Aguilar. The track was recognized as one of the best-performing songs of the year on the Pop/Ballad field at the 1999 ASCAP Latin Awards.

Commercial performance
"Vuelve" is one of Martin's most commercially successful songs in his career. In Latin America, it reached number one in Costa Rica El Salvador, Guatemala, Honduras, Nicaragua, Peru, Puerto Rico, and Venezuela. It also peaked at number five in Panama and on the ballads chart in Mexico. In the United States, "Vuelve" debuted at number five on the Billboard Hot Latin Songs on the week of February 14, 1998. The single reached on top of the chart two weeks later, succeeding "My Heart Will Go On" by Celine Dion, becoming Martin's first number one hit in the chart. It spent two consecutive weeks in this position being replaced by "No Sé Olvidar" by Alejandro Fernández. "Vuelve" ended 1998 as the fourth best-performing song of 1998. The track also reached the top of the Latin Pop Airplay and Tropical Airplay charts. On the former chart, it spent a total of three weeks in this position and was the best-performing song of the year. In November 1999, it was labeled as one of the "hottest tracks" for Sony Discos in a list including the most successful songs released by the label since the launching of the Billboard Hot Latin Tracks chart in 1986.

Music video

A music video for "Vuelve" was filmed at the Ennis House in Los Angeles, California, and directed by American director Wayne Isham. At the beginning of the video, Martin is facing the rain. Afterwards, he appears performing the track at various areas of the house. Carlos Mario Castro from El Sabanero X described the visual as "simple but high quality". Cristal Mesa from mitú named it Martin's 24th best music video on her 2018 list and commented on that the "fresh-faced singer was melting hearts with his smooth face and extra stylized hair". An author of Cultura Colectiva listed it among the "13 Videos to Appreciate Ricky Martin's Talent and Sickening Good Looks". It was later included on Martin's video compilation albums The Ricky Martin Video Collection (1999), La Historia (2001),  and 17 (2008). The music video was uploaded on the singer's YouTube channel on October 3, 2009, and has received over 90 million views, as of September 2021.

Live performances and appearances in media

The day after releasing the album, Martin held two sold-out concerts at the 30,000-seat Hiram Bithorn Stadium in Puerto Rico on February 13 and 14, 1998, respectively, where he performed "Vuelve". It was included as part of the setlist for the "Vuelve Tour", and subsequent tours including the Livin' la Vida Loca Tour, One Night Only with Ricky Martin, Música + Alma + Sexo World Tour, Ricky Martin Live, Live in Mexico, One World Tour, All In, the Movimiento Tour, and the Enrique Iglesias and Ricky Martin Live in Concert. He also performed "Vuelve" along with his other hits during the 48th, 55th, and 61st editions of the Viña del Mar International Song Festival in 2007, 2014, and 2020, respectively. A live version of "Vuelve" was recorded and taped as part of his MTV Unplugged set in Miami, Florida on August 17, 2006. This version of "Vuelve" reached number seven in Chile according to the Associated Press. The artist then promoted MTV Unplugged with the Black and White Tour, including four sold-out shows at the José Miguel Agrelot Coliseum in Puerto Rico. The concerts in Puerto Rico were compiled into his second live album Ricky Martin... Live Black & White Tour (2007) which includes his performance of "Vuelve". De Vita included "Vuelve" on the set list for his Libre Tour in 2017.

Dominican Republic singer-songwriter Juan Luis Guerra performed a live bachata cover of the song at the Latin Recording Academy Person of the Year gala where Martin was honored with the accolade in 2006 and Guerra's rendition received the most applause. "Vuelve" has been covered by several contestants on various music talent shows. Andrea López y Jonathan González performed the song on the third season of Cantando por un Sueño in 2011. The following year, La Mole performed it on its fourth season along with Natalie Scalzadonna. In the same year, Gonzalo Andrada covered the track on La Voz Argentinas first season. On its third season in 2021, Alex Freidig and Oscar Rojas competed in a battle of covering the song, which Freidig won. Also in 2021, Yohan Amparo performed the track on season one of The Voice Dominicana. Prior to the single's release, "Vuelve" served as the theme song for the Mexican telenovela Sin ti which premiered on December 8, 1997.

Formats and track listings

Austrian CD single
"Vuelve" – 5:08
"Entre el Amor y los Halagos" – 4:20

German CD maxi-single
"Vuelve" – 5:08
"Entre el Amor y los Halagos" – 4:20
"Vuelo" – 3:58
"Susana" – 4:54

Mexican  7" single
"Vuelve" – 5:08
"La Copa de la Vida" – 4:29

Mexican promotional single
"Vuelve" – 5:08

Credits and personnel
Credits adapted from Tidal.

 Ricky Martin vocal, associated performer
 Franco De Vita composer, lyricist
 Robi Draco Rosa producer, background vocal, recording engineer
 K.C. Porter producer, piano
 David Campbell arranger
 Kieran Murray assistant engineer
 Rafa Sardina assistant engineer
 Teresa Cassin assistant engineer
 Scott Kieklak assistant engineer
 Robert Valdez assistant engineer
 Paul Gordon assistant engineer
 Bill Smith assistant engineer
 Luis Villanueva assistant engineer
 Alberto Pino assistant engineer
 Dave Dominguez assistant engineer
 Francisco "Panchoî" assistant engineer
 Tomaselli assistant engineer
 Gene Lo assistant engineer
 Iris Salazar assistant engineer
 Jeff Shannon assistant engineer
 Jorge M. Jaramillo assistant engineer
 Juan Rosario assistant engineer
 Jules Condar assistant engineer, recording engineer
 Julia Waters background vocal
 Phil Perry background vocal
 Ricky Nelson background vocal
 John West background vocal
 Darryl Phinnessee background vocal
 Josie Aiello background vocal
 Oren Waters background vocal
 Carmen Twillie background vocal
 Stefanie Spruill background vocal
 James Gilstrap background vocal
 Kristle Murden background vocal
 Marlena Jeter background vocal
 Bunny Hill background vocal
 GB Dorsey background vocal
 Jackeline Simley background vocal
 Katrina Harper background vocal
 Martonette Jenkins background vocal
 Maxine Jeter background vocal
 Phillip Ingram background vocal
 Reggie Hamilton bass
 Curt Bisquera drums
 Michael Landau electric guitar
 Benny Faccone mixing engineer
 Bobby Rothstein mixing engineer
 Chris Brooke mixing engineer
 Jun Murakawa mixing engineer
 Luis Quiñe mixing engineer
 Mike Aarvold mixing engineer
 Mike Ainsworth mixing engineer
 Travis Smith mixing engineer
 Chris Carroll mixing engineer
 Todd Keller mixing engineer
 Leo Herrera mixing engineer
 John Beasley piano
 Randy Waldman piano
 Esteban Villanueva project coordintor, recording engineer
 Sarah Wykes project coordintor
 Iris Aponte project coordintor
 Steve Churchyard recording engineer
 John Lowson recording engineer
 Ted Stein recording engineer
 Robert Fernandez recording engineer
 Brian Jenkins recording engineer
 Doc Wiley recording engineer
 Benny Faccone recording engineer
 Carlos Nieto recording engineer
 Charles Dye recording engineer
 Danny Vicari recording engineer
 Femio Hernandez recording engineer
 Héctor Iván Rosa recording engineer
 Jeff Poe recording engineer
 Jesus "Chuy" Flores recording engineer
 John Karpowich recording engineer
 Karl Cameron recording engineer
 Keith Rose recording engineer
 Luis Fernando Soria recording engineer
 Matt Ross Hyde recording engineer
 Peter McCabe recording engineer
 Rik Pekkonen recording engineer

Charts

Weekly charts

Year-end charts

Release history

See also
Billboard Hot Latin Songs Year-End Chart
List of number-one Billboard Hot Latin Tracks of 1998
List of Billboard Latin Pop Airplay number ones of 1998
List of Billboard Tropical Airplay number ones of 1998

References

External links

1998 songs
1998 singles
1990s ballads
Gospel songs
Ricky Martin songs
Franco De Vita songs
Songs written by Franco De Vita
Spanish-language songs
Pop ballads
Rock ballads
Song recordings produced by K. C. Porter
Sony Discos singles
Telenovela theme songs